Seldon v Clarkson, Wright and Jakes [2012] UKSC 16 is a UK labour law case, concerning the discrimination under what is now the Equality Act 2010.

Facts
Mr Seldon, a partner, claimed direct age discrimination for being compulsorily retired after he turned 65. He joined the partnership in 1971, became an equity partner in 1972, and revised the partnership deed in 2005 which restated that partners would retire the December after turning age 65. He asked to stay, but was offered £30,000 to retire instead. He claimed age discrimination under EEAR 2006 regulation 17. The partnership argued it was justified by business need.

The Employment Tribunal held he was less favourably treated, but it was justified for (1) giving other associates the opportunity of partnership within a reasonable time – and therefore to remain with the firm (2) workforce planning (3) limiting need to expel underperforming partners. It upheld, however, a victimisation claim. The EAT, said although an aim of ‘collegiality’ was not legitimate, the decision could be right, although it would have to be remitted to decide afresh. It should have considered if another age would have been proportionate. The Court of Appeal dismissed his appeal. Mr Seldon argued that the justification had to relate to him, not the firm.

Judgment
Lady Hale held that Mr Seldon had not suffered unjustifiable age discrimination, and rejected the claim that it could not be justified in relation to business need. However, it was remitted to Tribunal to decide whether, on the facts, an age of 65 was legitimate.

Lord Hope, Lord Brown, Lord Mance and Lord Kerr.

See also

UK labour law
European Union law

Notes

References

United Kingdom labour case law